Ivan Rusev may refer to:

Ivan Rusev (footballer) (born 1979), Bulgarian footballer
Ivan Rusev (badminton) (born 1993), Bulgarian badminton player